The 2021 V.League 1 (known as the LS V.League 1 for sponsorship reasons) was the 65th professional season of the top-flight football league in Vietnam.

The season was paused for a third time on 6 May 2021 due to an outbreak of the delta variant of the coronavirus in the country.

Despite attempts to re-start the season by late November, after a meeting with all teams on August 21, the season was officially cancelled, with no champion determined, and no relegation teams; the slots for the 2022 AFC Champions League and 2022 AFC Cup to be determined at a later stage.

Competition format

The league was scheduled to operate in two stages, with the top six teams and bottom 8 teams split into two play-off sections after a single-round robin first stage. The season was cancelled before the completion of the first stage.

Teams
A total of 14 teams contested the league, including 13 sides from the 2020 season and Topenland Binh Dinh promoted from the 2020 V.League 2 season.

Stadiums and locations

Personnel and kits

Managerial changes

Foreign players
Players name in bold indicates the player was registered after the start of the season.

 Naturalized players whose parents or grandparents were born in Vietnam, thus are regarded as local players.

First phase

Table

Positions by round
This table lists the positions of teams after each week of matches.

Results

Season progress

Season statistics

Scoring

Top scorers

Source: Soccerway

Hat-tricks

Clean sheets

References

Vietnamese Super League seasons
Vietnam
2021 in Vietnamese football
Vietnam